Koenraad Degroote (born 30 September 1959 in Kortrijk) is a Belgian politician and is affiliated to the N-VA. He was elected as a member of the Belgian Chamber of Representatives in 2010.

He's mayor of Dentergem since 1989.

Notes

Living people
Members of the Chamber of Representatives (Belgium)
New Flemish Alliance politicians
1959 births
People from West Flanders
21st-century Belgian politicians